The Altamont Pass wind farm is located in the Altamont Pass of the Diablo Range in Northern California. It is one of the earliest wind farms in the United States. The first wind turbines were placed on the Altamont in the early 1980s by Fayette Manufacturing Corporation on land owned by cattle rancher Joe Jess. The wind farm is composed of 4930 relatively small wind turbines of various types, making it at one time the largest wind farm in the world in terms of capacity.  Altamont Pass is still one of the largest concentration of wind turbines in the world, with a capacity of 576 megawatts (MW), producing about 125 MW on average and 1.1 terawatt-hours (TWh) yearly.  They were installed after the 1970s energy crisis in response to favorable tax policies for investors.

In the media

When the first windfarms appeared in 1981, on the Altamont hills alongside the Altamont Pass portion of the I-580 freeway, the appearance of the modern windmill generated media excitement and public interest.  This portion of the freeway was an increasingly used corridor for growing the bedroom communities of Tracy, Lodi and Modesto serving the Bay Area of California (Oakland, San Francisco and Pleasanton).  Daily commuters crowded past the otherwise barren cattle ranches for several hours each day.

By 1985, the Altamont Pass was crowded with over 26 different windfarms.  The increased visibility from the nearby I-580 freeway, which had once sparked the media and community's interest, was now widely regarded as a growing eyesore. 
Successful windfarms at the Altamont Pass encouraged the development of further industrial wind areas in southern California. These windfarms, in the Tehachapi Pass, led to wider recognition, after windmills played a role as a prominent backdrop in several feature films of the mid- and late 1980s including the 1985 film based on the Bret Easton Ellis novel Less than Zero, featuring Andrew McCarthy and Robert Downey, Jr.

Environmental effects
The small turbines used at Altamont are dangerous to various raptors that hunt California ground squirrels in the area. 1300 raptors are killed annually, among them 70 golden eagles, which are federally protected; in total, 4700 birds are killed annually including the endangered California condor.  Overall there has been an 80% decline in golden eagles in Northern California, with no golden eagles nesting near the facility, although it is a prime habitat.
Considered largely obsolete, these numerous small turbines are being gradually replaced with much larger and more cost-effective units. The larger units rotate at a much lower angular frequency to the previous turbines, and, being elevated higher, are claimed to be less hazardous to the local wildlife. This claim is supported by a report done for the Bonneville Power Administration.

As of 2010, a settlement has been reached between the Audubon Society, Californians for Renewable Energy and NextEra Energy Resources (who operate some 5,000 turbines in the area). Nearly half of the smaller turbines will be replaced by newer, more bird-friendly models. The project was expected to be complete by 2015 and included $2.5 million for raptor habitat restoration.

Wind farms
The Altamont Pass Wind Farm is now composed of five constituent wind farms. The Golden Hills Wind Farm is the largest constituent wind farm, as well as being the only one located south of Altamont Pass.

Repowering
In 2015, NextEra – which owns some of the 100kW Kenetech/US Windpower older turbines installed during the 1980s – agreed to remove the machines and replace them with 48 new model wind turbines. A power purchase agreement has been completed to power the Googleplex office complex in nearby Mountain View, California. The process of removing old wind turbines and replacing them with newer machines is called repowering.

A portion of the wind energy center is being dismantled as of 2016. Altamont Winds Inc (AWI)'s 83MW of 100 kW Kenetech turbines are being taken down.  These are older models with lattice towers.  It has been proposed to replace them with 27 turbines with rated capacity of 2.1MW each (56.7MW total).

The Scott Haggerty wind farm replaced 569 100-kW turbines with 23 modern turbines in 2021.

See also

List of power stations in California
Wind power in California
Wind power in the United States

References

External links

30 photos of Altamont Pass wind farm
Wind farms of the World

Energy infrastructure completed in 1981
Buildings and structures in Alameda County, California
Wind farms in California
Tracy, California
Energy in the San Francisco Bay Area
1981 establishments in California